Sterling is a town in Sanpete County, Utah, United States. The population was 235 at the 2000 census.

Geography
According to the United States Census Bureau, the town has a total area of 0.2 square mile (0.6 km2), all land.

Climate
According to the Köppen Climate Classification system, Sterling has a semi-arid climate, abbreviated "BSk" on climate maps.

Demographics

As of the census of 2000, there were 235 people, 73 households, and 58 families residing in the town. The population density was 976.3 people per square mile (378.1/km2). There were 81 housing units at an average density of 336.5 per square mile (130.3/km2). The racial makeup of the town was 97.45% White, 1.28% Native American, 0.43% from other races, and 0.85% from two or more races. Hispanic or Latino of any race were 1.70% of the population.

There were 73 households, out of which 45.2% had children under the age of 18 living with them, 60.3% were married couples living together, 11.0% had a female householder with no husband present, and 20.5% were non-families. 19.2% of all households were made up of individuals, and 9.6% had someone living alone who was 65 years of age or older. The average household size was 3.22 and the average family size was 3.72.

In the town, the population was spread out, with 37.0% under the age of 18, 10.6% from 18 to 24, 22.6% from 25 to 44, 18.7% from 45 to 64, and 11.1% who were 65 years of age or older. The median age was 28 years. For every 100 females, there were 95.8 males. For every 100 females age 18 and over, there were 89.7 males.

The median income for a household in the town was $27,019, and the median income for a family was $30,313. Males had a median income of $26,458 versus $19,000 for females. The per capita income for the town was $12,041. About 9.7% of families and 10.6% of the population were below the poverty line, including 8.6% of those under the age of eighteen and none of those 65 or over.

References

External links

 Official website

Towns in Sanpete County, Utah
Towns in Utah
Populated places established in 1873
1873 establishments in Utah Territory